Attila Dorogi (born 18 August 1987 in Mosonmagyaróvár) is a Hungarian football player who currently plays for Győri ETO FC.

References
Győri ETO FC Official website

1987 births
Living people
Hungarian footballers
Győri ETO FC players
People from Mosonmagyaróvár
Association football midfielders
Sportspeople from Győr-Moson-Sopron County